Cuñaba is one of eight parishes (administrative divisions) in Peñamellera Baja, a municipality within the province and autonomous community of Asturias, in northern Spain. It is located in the Picos de Europa National Park.

The population is 47 (INE 2011).

Parishes in Peñamellera Baja